Kangean or Kangeanese is a language spoken in Indonesia. It is native to Kangean and the surrounding islands. Kangean lies to the north of Bali, the northwest of Lombok and the east of Madura. The Kangean language is partly mutually intelligible with standard Madurese. The Kangeanese language speakers are Kangeanese (the natives of Kangean).

References

Languages of Indonesia
Madurese language